The 2013 President's Cup (tennis) was a professional tennis tournament played on outdoor hard courts. It was the 7th edition for men and the 5th edition for women of the tournament and was part of the 2013 ITF Women's Circuit and the 2013 ATP Challenger Tour, offering prize money of $125,000 for men and $100,000 for women. It took place in Astana, Kazakhstan, on 22–28 July 2013.

ATP singles main draw entrants

Seeds

Other entrants 
The following players received wildcards into the singles main draw:
  Timur Khabibulin
  Alexey Nesterov
  Dmitry Popko
  Denis Yevseyev

The following players received entry from the qualifying draw:
  Egor Gerasimov
  Aslan Karatsev
  Alexander Kudryavtsev
  Mikhail Ledovskikh

The following player received entry by a lucky loser:
  Mikhail Biryukov

WTA singles main draw entrants

Seeds 

 1 Rankings as of 15 July 2013

Other entrants 
The following players received wildcards into the singles main draw:
  Asiya Dair
  Kamila Kerimbayeva
  Ksenia Pervak
  Anastasiya Yepisheva

The following players received entry from the qualifying draw:
  Yana Buchina
  Varvara Flink
  Ksenia Kirillova
  Eugeniya Pashkova

Champions

Men's singles 

  Dudi Sela def.  Mikhail Kukushkin 5–7, 6–2, 7–6(8–6)

Women's singles 

  Nadiya Kichenok def.  Maria João Koehler 6–4, 7–5

Men's doubles 

  Riccardo Ghedin /  Claudio Grassi def.  Andrey Golubev /  Mikhail Kukushkin 3–6, 6–3, [10–8]

Women's doubles 

  Lyudmyla Kichenok /  Nadiya Kichenok def.  Nina Bratchikova /  Valeria Solovyeva 6–2, 6–2

External links 
 Official website

2013
2013 ATP Challenger Tour
2013 ITF Women's Circuit
Hard court tennis tournaments